The decade of the 1530s in music (years 1530–1539) involved some significant events, publications, compositions, births, and deaths.

Events 
1532: Thomas Tallis takes his first known musical appointment, as organist at Dover Priory.
1533: Claudin de Sermisy appointed a canon at Sainte-Chapelle in Paris
1534: Nicolas Gombert appointed a canon of Notre-Dame in Tournai
1535: Cristobal Morales joins the papal choir at St Peter's basilica, Rome
1536: Pierre Certon appointed Master of the Choristers at Sainte Chapelle in Paris.
1538: Tallis moves from Dover to Waltham Abbey.
 Thomas Appleby appointed organist and choirmaster at Lincoln Cathedral
1539: Joan Brudieu appointed maestro di capilla at la Seu d'Urgell Cathedral in Catalonia, a position he held until his death (bar a couple of gaps) until his death in 1591.

Publications

1530
Madrigali de diversi musici: libro primo de la Serena (Rome: Valerio Dorico). The first book of madrigals to be identified by that name.  The majority of pieces are by Philippe Verdelot.

1532
Carpentras
First book of masses (Avignon: Jean de Channay)
Lamentations for five voices (Avignon: Jean de Channay)
 Hans Gerle –  (Nuremberg: Hieronymous Formschneider), an instructional book for playing and arranging for the viola, rebec, and lute
Sebald Heyden – De arte canendi: Rudimenta, first installment of an important treatise on singing

1533
 Hans Gerle - 2nd collection of lute music Tabulatur auff die Laudten published in Nuremberg. It included arrangements of pieces by Jean Mouton, Josquin and Jacob Obrecht
 Clement Janequin – Vingt et quatre chansons musicales...composes par maistre CL Janequin published by Pierre Attaignant in Paris
 Philippe Verdelot – First book of madrigals for four voices, published by Ottaviano Scotto in Venice

1534
 Philippe Verdelot – Second book of madrigals for four voices, published by Scotto in Venice

1535
 Silvestro Ganassi dal Fontego – Opera intitulata Fontegara, a treatise on recorder playing, published in Venice
 Philippe Verdelot – First book of madrigals for five voices, published by Scotto in Venice

1536
 Sebastian z Felsztyna – treatise 'De Musica Dialogi VI'
 Luis de Milán –  (Valencia: Francisco Diaz Romano), the first collection of music for the vihuela
 Francesco da Milano – Five volumes of lute music published in Milan

1537
Carpentras – August 25:  (Book of songs for three voices) (Rome: Valerio & Luigi Dorico)
Sebald Heyden – De arte canendi, second installment, important treatise on singing
Clement Janequin – Les Chansons de la Guerre, La Chasse, Le Chant des Oyseaux, L'Alouette, Le Rossignol, published by Pierre Attaignment in Paris
Philippe Verdelot – Second book of madrigals for five voices published by Scotto in Venice

1538
 Luis de Narváez –  (Valladolid: Diego Hernandez), a large collection of lute music
 Philippe Verdelot – 
 , the first Protestant hymn-book, published in Ulm.

1539
 Jacques Arcadelt
First book of madrigals for four voices (Venice: Antonio Gardano), the most reprinted madrigal book of the sixteenth century
Second book of madrigals for four voices (Venice: Antonio Gardano)
Third book of madrigals for four voices (Venice: Girolamo Scotto)
Fourth book of madrigals for four voices (Venice: Antonio Gardano)
 Noel Bauldeweyn – Missa da Pacem (Nuremberg: Ott, RISM 15392). Published under the name of Josquin des Prez.
 Jean Calvin – First edition of 'The Geneva Psalter'
 Alfonso dalla Viola – First book of madrigals for four voices (Ferrara: Henrico De Campis & Antonio Hucher for Giovanni De Buglhat)
 Georg Forster – First volume of his 'Fresh German Songs' published in Nuremberg
 Nicolas Gombert
First book of motets for four voices (Venice: Girolamo Scotto)
First book of motets for five voices (Venice: Girolamo Scotto)
 Paul Hofhaimer – collection of musical settings of the odes of Horace 'Harmoniae Poeticae', published in Nuremberg
 Jacquet of Mantua
First book of motets for five voices (Venice: Girolamo Scotto)
First book of motets for four voices (Venice: Girolamo Scotto)
Pierre de Manchicourt – Book 14: 19 Motets for four voices (Paris: Pierre Attaingnant & Hubert Jullet), the last volume in Attaingnant's motet series and the only one dedicated to a single composer

Classical music

1530
 We-Liang-Hu composed music for a play by 14th-century poet Gao Ming.

Sacred music

1533
 Nicolas Gombert – Cuis colis Ausoniam, motet for six voices to a text by Nicolaus Grudius, celebrating the treaty signed in Bologna by Emperor Charles V, Pope Clement VII, and several other Italian rulers

1539
 Johannes Heugel – Consolamini, popule meus, for eight voices, probably the earliest German composition for double choir
Costanzo Festa – Hyntni per totum annum

Births 
c.1530: Juan Navarro, Spanish composer.
c.1530: Nicolas de La Grotte, French composer and keyboard player.
c.1530: Richard Farrant, English composer of church music, choirmaster, playwright and theatre producer (d.1580)
c.1530: Guillaume Costeley, French composer and organist (died 1606)
 1530: Teodora Ginés, Dominican musician and composer (died 1598)
 1531: Ercole Bottrigari, Italian scholar, mathematician, poet, music theorist, architect and composer (died 1612)
c.1520/31: Guillaume Costeley, French composer (died 1606)
c.1531/32: Jacobus de Kerle, Flemish composer, organist, choirmaster and priest (d.1591)
 1532: Hernando Franco, Spanish composer and choirmaster. The earliest known composer of music in Guatemala (d.1585)
December 5 – Nikolaus Selnecker, German theologian, hymn-writer, organist and cleric (d.1592)
February 19 – Jean-Antonie de Baif, French poet, co-founder of the Academie de Poesie et de Musique in Paris (d.1589)
January 21 – Ludwig Hembold, German poet and hymn writer (died 1598)
March 25 – Pietro Pontio, Italian theorist and composer (died 1596)
date unknown – Giammateo Asola, Italian composer (died 1609)
probable – Orlando de Lassus aka Roland de Latre, Franco-Flemish composer of late Renaissance music (died 1594)
 Adam Puschmann, German poet, songwriter and Meistersinger (died 1600)
c.1532 David Koler, German composer and Kapellmeister (died 1565)
 c. 1530–40: Giorgio Mainerio, Italian composer (died 1582)
1533:
c.1533 Laurent de Vos, Flemish composer, singer and musician. Murdered in Cambrai 1580.
 October 16 – Gallus Dressler, German composer, theorist and cantor. (died 1580s)
April 8 – Claudio Merulo, Italian organist, composer and publisher (died 1604)
date unknown - Andrea Gabrieli, Italian composer and organist (died 1585)
 1534: Lodovico Agostini, Italian composer (died 1590)
Giovanni De' Bardi, Italian writer, composer and soldier. Host and patron of the Florentine Camerata.
Lucas Osiander, German Protestant theologian and hymn composer. Born Nuremberg. (died 1604)
Fernando de Las Infantas, Spanish composer, theologian, priest and philanthropist. Born Cordoba. (died c.1610)
c.1534 Christian Ameyden, Flemish composer, tenor and choirmaster. Born Aerschot, Belgium. (died 1605)
 1535 Annibale Stabile, Italian composer, singer, choirmaster and priest. Born Naples. (died 1595)
 c.1535
 c.1535Cesare Negri, Italian dancing master (died c.1604)
c.1535Marc'Antonio Ingegneri, Italian composer, teacher and choirmaster.
Antoine de Bertrand, French composer (killed 1581)
Bernhard Schmid the Elder, German organist and music editor (died 1592)
Giaches de Wert, Flemish composer of Italian madrigals (died 1596)
probable – Innocentio Alberti, Italian instrumentalist and composer (died 1615)
 1536: Zhu Zaiyu, Chinese prince, music theorist, scholar and writer (died 1611)
 Alessandro Striggio, Italian composer, viol player and diplomat (died 1592)
 1537: Johann Wanning, Dutch-born composer, kapellmeister and alto singer (died 1603)
 Annibale Zoilo, Italian composer, singer and choirmaster (died 1592)
1538 Stefano Felis, Italian composer, singer and choirmaster (died 1603)
c.1538 Johannes Matelart, Flemish composer and choirmaster (died 1607))
c.1538 Robert White, English composer and choirmaster (died 1574)
 1539
December 20 – Paulus Melissus, writer and composer (died 1602)
c.1539 Paschal de L'Estocart, French composer (died c.1587)
c.1539 Ippolito Tartaglino, Italian composer (died c.1580)

Deaths 
 c.1530 Noel Bauldewijn, Flemish composer
 c.1530 Antonius Divitis, court composer of Louis XII of France
 1533:
September 20 - Nicolas Champion, composer and singer, c.58
 c.1535:
Pedro de Escobar, c.70
Bartolomeo Tromboncino, c.65
 1536: 
May 17 – Mark Smeaton, English court musician, executed for alleged adultery with Anne Boleyn (born 1512)
June 26 – Pierre Alamire, German-Dutch music copyist, composer, instrumentalist, mining engineer, merchant, diplomat and spy (born 1470)
 1537: Paul Hofhaimer, Austrian composer and organist (born 1459)
 1538:
March – Hans Buchner, organist and composer, 54
October – Maistre Jhan, composer (born c.1485)
Richard Davy, composer (c.72), died in Exeter
 1539:
December 12 – Bartolomeo degli Organi, composer, singer and organist, 64
December 20 – Johannes Lupi, composer (born c.1506)
Ottaviano Petrucci – printer and publisher 
c.1539 Andrea Antico – publisher, editor and composer (c.59)
c.1539 Dionisio Memmo – Italian organist and choirmaster. Worked in the court of Henry VIII

References

Music
16th century in music